Lonely Town is an album by jazz pianist Tommy Flanagan. It is a trio recording, with bassist Joe Benjamin and drummer Elvin Jones.

Background and recording 
The album was recorded in New York City on March 10, 1959.

Music 
The compositions are by Leonard Bernstein. They are: "America" and "Tonight" from West Side Story; "Lonely Town" and "Lucky to Be Me" from On the Town; "Glitter and Be Gay" and "Make Our Garden Grow" from Candide; and "It's Love" from Wonderful Town.

Track listing 
All tracks composed by Leonard Bernstein (track 3 with Stephen Sondheim; track 6 with Richard Wilbur).

"America" – 5:55 	
"Lonely Town" – 7:28 	
"Tonight" – 3:44 	
"It's Love" – 3:45 	
"Lucky to Be Me" – 4:15 	
"Glitter and Be Gay" – 4:13 	
"Make Our Garden Grow" – 3:10

Personnel 
 Tommy Flanagan – piano
 Joe Benjamin – bass
 Elvin Jones – drums

References 

1979 albums
Tommy Flanagan albums
Blue Note Records albums